The 1913 Oregon Agricultural Aggies football team represented Oregon Agricultural College (now known as Oregon State University) during the 1913 college football season. In their first season under head coach E. J. Stewart, the Aggies compiled a 3–2–3 record and were outscored by their opponents by a combined total of 75 to 59. Against major opponents, the Aggies lost to Washington (0–47), tied Oregon (10–10), and defeated Washington State (10–2) and Idaho (3–0).  The team played its home games at Bell Field in Corvallis, Oregon. Otto Sitton was the team captain.

Schedule

References

Oregon Agricultural
Oregon State Beavers football seasons
Oregon Agricultural Aggies football